Kamo Stephane Bayi (born 17 August 1996) is an Ivorian professional footballer who plays as a forward for I-League club NEROCA.

Career
Bayi was born in the Ivory Coast, but started his career in Nigeria with Akwa Starlets. In 2016, he moved to India to play for Calcutta Football League side George Telegraph. After the Kolkata season was complete, Bayi moved to another Indian state, Goa, to play for Goa Professional League side Salgaocar.

Aizawl 
On 2 January 2017, Bayi signed with Aizawl of the I-League. He made his debut for the club on 7 January in their league opener against East Bengal. He started and played the whole match, as Aizawl drew 1–1.

Mohun Bagan 
In June 2017, Bayi signed for Mohun Bagan for the Calcutta Football League. He made his debut for the Mariners on 19 August 2017 in their 5–2 win against Pathachakra, in which he scored a hat-trick.

Gokulam Kerala 
On 19 November 2017, it was announced that Kamo has signed for the new entrants of I-League, Gokulam Kerala for 2017–18 season.

Personal life
His brother, Bazie Armand, is also a professional footballer. Both of them started their professional career in India.

Career statistics

Club

Honours

Club
Aizawl FC
I-League: 2016–17

References

External links
Kamo Stephane Bayi at Khel Now

1996 births
Living people
Ivorian footballers
George Telegraph S.C. players
Salgaocar FC players
Aizawl FC players
Association football forwards
Calcutta Football League players
Goa Professional League players
I-League players
Expatriate footballers in India
Dakkada F.C. players
Tollygunge Agragami FC players